The Central Bank of the Republic of San Marino (CBSM), is the central bank of San Marino.

The central bank's endowment fund is currently €12.9 million divided into 2,500 indivisible registered shares worth €5,164.57 each. The possessory title of these shares is reserved to the state, as majority shareholder, and to San Marino undertakings engaged in credit, financial and insurance activities.

Pursuant to art. 3 of its statutes the Central Bank of the Republic of San Marino will exercise its powers for the purpose of:
 promoting the stability of the financial system and protecting savings, whose substantial social value is recognised by the republic, through supervision of the credit, financial and insurance activities in which authorised intermediaries are engaged;
 providing banking and financial services to the state and to the public administration, one purpose being to coordinate the management of liquidity and the choice of forms of financing;
 providing adequate support to the financial system of the Republic, to include performing the functions of incentive and guidance;
 facilitating economic and financial activity, setting up and maintaining efficient and reliable payment systems for the republic.

The central bank is answerable for the attainment of its objectives to the Grand and General Council (parliament).

Powers of the CBSM
In order to achieve the objectives and carry out the functions assigned by law, the central bank, through its organs and in its respective areas of competence, may adopt measures, to include those in the form of regulations, orders, circulars, standard letters, recommendations and instructions, which will, besides being of a cogent nature in dealings with supervised parties, also perform the function of explaining and interpreting the tasks assigned to the central bank by Law. 
The central bank will, adopting the methods regarded as most appropriate, make public the measures referred to in the previous paragraph if they are of general relevance and addressed to the public.

Relations with state institutions and international banking and financial bodies
The central bank will be entitled to assist and inform the Congress of State, through the Department of the State Secretary for Finance, on economic matters and measures which, in the opinion of the central bank, can be associated with and influence the pursuit of the central bank's institutional objectives. The central bank will put forward resolutions and comments on proposed laws and on normative instruments referring directly to the objectives and functions reserved by the law to the central bank, and also draft proposed bills and normative instruments on matters within its sphere of competence, to be submitted to the Congress of State through the Committee for Credit and Savings. The central bank, through the Committee for Credit and Savings, will forward information to the Congress of State on the more significant facts noted or obtained in the exercise of its institutional functions. Jointly with the representatives of the Congress of State, the central bank will represent the Republic of San Marino in all the international financial institutions in which the republic takes part.

Shareholders

 State (Republic of San Marino – ): 67%
 Cassa di Risparmio della Repubblica di San Marino: 16%
 Banca di San Marino: 6%
 Banca Agricola Commerciale Istituto Bancario Sammarinese: 5%
 Banca CIS - Credito Industriale Sammarinese: 5%
 Banca Sammarinese di Investimento: 1%

Governing bodies

Shareholders meeting 
During the annual meeting, shareholders approve the financial statement and the annual report, which are prepared and presented by the Governing Council, and decide on the admission of new members to the capital of the institution. The state is represented by the Secretary of State for Finance and Budget and by another representative of the government.

Governing Council 
The governing council is made up by the chairman and by five councillors, which are appointed by the Grand and General Council (parliament), for a five-year mandate with the possibility of being re-elected for one additional term. The law assigns to the governing council the powers of policymaking and management of the central bank. The governing council is responsible for preparing the financial statement and submitting it to the shareholders' assembly for approval, accompanied by an explanatory Annual Report. The council is also vested with the power of appointing the director-general, the Supervision Committee, the deputy director, the officers and the general hiring of new staff members.
 Catia Tomasetti - Chairman, since May 2018
 Francesco Mancini - Vice Chairman
 Gian Luca Amici - Member
 Martina Mazza - Member
 Antonella Mularoni - Member
 Giacomo Volpinari - Member

Director General
The director-general is appointed by the governing council for a six-year term. He attends the meetings of the shareholders and of the Governing Council without voting rights and acts as the chair of the Supervision Committee. The director-general is responsible for managing human resources, coordinating and supervising the work to be carried out.
 Roberto Moretti – director-general

Supervision Committee
The Supervision Committee is vested by law with the power of carrying out the supervisory functions on the banking, financial and insurance industry of San Marino, through inspections, reporting activity and regulation.
 Roberto Moretti – chairman
 Marco Giulianelli – internal inspector
 Maurizio Pappalardo – internal inspector
 Andrea Vivoli – external inspector

Board of Statutory Auditors
Auditors are responsible for supervising the management of the central bank, especially for what regards the compliance of financial statements with the provision of law.
 Pier Angela Gasperoni – chairman
 Monica Zafferani – statutory auditor
 Valentina Di Francesco – statutory auditor

Headquarters
Via del Voltone, 120
RSM 47890 - Città di San Marino
LRepubblica di San Marino

Linked items
Economy of San Marino
Sammarinese Lira
Sammarinese euro coins

References

External links
Official site: Central Bank of San Marino
Official site: Financial Intelligence Agency
Official site: Department of the State Secretary for Finance
Official site: Office of Economic planning, Data processing and Statistics
Official site: Philatelic and numismatic Office
Official site: Chamber of Commerce of the Republic of San Marino

Banks of San Marino
San Marino
San Marino
2005 establishments in San Marino
Banks established in 2005
Law of San Marino
Regulators